

Events

Works
 Approximate date
 Francis of Assisi, Laudes creaturarum or Cantico delle creature ("Praise of God's creation", the oldest known Italian poetry)
 King Horn, the oldest known English verse romance

Births
 Paio Gomes Charinho (died 1295), poet and troubadour
 Guan Hanqing (died 1302), Chinese playwright and poet in the Yuan Dynasty
 Shem-Tov ibn Falaquera (died 1290), Hebrew poet in Al-Andalus

Deaths
 Jien (born 1155), Japanese poet, historian, and Buddhist monk

See also

 Poetry
 List of years in poetry

References

13th-century poetry
Poetry